Black Rock Plantation House, also known as the Allen-Love House, is a historic plantation house located near Riegelwood, Columbus County, North Carolina. It was built about 1845, and is a two-story, five-bay, braced frame I-house with Federal / Greek Revival style interior design elements. The house is sheathed in weatherboard and has a gable roof. It has a rear shed roof addition and a replacement one-story shed roofed front porch.  The house was renovated in 2013.

It was listed on the National Register of Historic Places in 2014.

References 

Plantation houses in North Carolina
Houses on the National Register of Historic Places in North Carolina
Federal architecture in North Carolina
Greek Revival houses in North Carolina
Houses completed in 1845
Houses in Columbus County, North Carolina
National Register of Historic Places in Columbus County, North Carolina